Alexandru Muta (1935 – 8 June 2012) was a Romanian football manager who worked mainly for FC Bihor Oradea. Over the years, he performed several functions, from youth coach and youth center manager to technical director, manager and assistant manager of the senior squad.

Alexandru Muta managed FC Bihor Oradea in the top-flight of the Romanian football during the 1990–91 season and as an assistant manager collaborated with important managers such as Ioan Reinhardt, Robert Cosmoc, Ștefan Coidum or Gheorghe Staicu.

Despite his good CV at senior level, Muta was recognized in Romania as one of the most important coaches of the youth sector, over time promoting players such as Zeno Bundea, Cristian Lupuț, Cosmin Bărcăuan or Erik Lincar, among many others. He was also considered as an important professor and theorist, Mircea Lucescu affirming that he was inspired several times by Muta's work.

Honours
Bihor Oradea
Divizia B: 1981–82, 1987–88
Divizia C: 1997–98

References

1935 births
2012 deaths
Sportspeople from Oradea
Romanian football managers
Liga I managers
FC Bihor Oradea managers